Horton is a masculine given name. People or fictional characters named Horton include:

 Horton D. Haight (1832–1900), Mormon pioneer
 Horton Foote (1916–2009), American playwright and screenwriter
 Horton H. Hobbs, Jr. (1914–1994), American taxonomist and carcinologist
 Horton Smith (1908–1963), American golfer and first winner of the Masters Tournament
 Horton Williams (born 1933), retired judge of the Supreme Court of South Australia
 Horton the Elephant, fictional Dr. Seuss character

See also
Horton (disambiguation)
Horton (surname)